Shii can refer to:

 Shi'a Islam
 The Japanese name of the tree genus Castanopsis
 Shii-chan, the cat from Kamichama Karin
 Kazuo Shii, Chairman of the Japanese Communist Party
 Japanese ship Shii, several Japanese ships